John Hall Stephens (November 22, 1847 – November 18, 1924) was a U.S. Representative from Texas.

Born in Shelby County, Texas, Stephens attended the common schools in Mansfield, Texas. He graduated from Mansfield College, and from the law department of Cumberland University, Lebanon, Tennessee, in 1872. After gaining admission to the bar in 1873, he practiced in Montague, Montague County, and Vernon, Wilbarger County, Texas. He served as a member of the Texas State Senate from 1886 to 1888, and then resumed the practice of law in Vernon, Texas.

Stephens was elected as a Democrat to the Fifty-fifth and to the nine succeeding Congresses (March 4, 1897 – March 3, 1917). He served as chair of the Committee on Indian Affairs (Sixty-second through Sixty-fourth Congresses). He was an unsuccessful candidate for renomination in 1916.

He moved to Monrovia, California, in 1917, and died there November 18, 1924. He was interred in East View Cemetery, Vernon, Texas. Stephens County, Oklahoma, was named for him.

Sources

1847 births
1924 deaths
Cumberland School of Law alumni
Democratic Party members of the United States House of Representatives from Texas
People from Mansfield, Texas
People from Shelby County, Texas
Democratic Party Texas state senators